Nicolás Del Grecco  (born 19 November 1993) is an Argentine footballer who plays as a defender for Villa Mitre.

References

External links 
 

1993 births
Argentine footballers
Living people
Association football defenders
Argentine expatriate footballers
Boca Juniors footballers
Club Atlético Tigre footballers
C.D. Olimpia players
Chicago Fire FC players
FC Tulsa players
Atlético de Rafaela footballers
Libertad de Sunchales footballers
Villa Mitre footballers
USL Championship players
Torneo Argentino A players
Argentine expatriate sportspeople in Honduras
Argentine expatriate sportspeople in the United States
Expatriate footballers in Honduras
Expatriate soccer players in the United States
Sportspeople from Córdoba Province, Argentina